Lên đồng (votive dance, "to mount the medium", or "going into trance") is a ritual practiced in Vietnamese folk religion, in which followers become spirit mediums for various kinds of spirits. 

There is  a common confusion between "lên đồng" and "hầu bóng" (which is the most prominent ritual of Đạo Mẫu). During a ceremony of "Hầu Bóng" (lit. Serving the (Holy) Reflections), a priest or priestess would mimic the deities by dressing and acting like them. The priest is in full control of their body. A successful ceremony is one in which the priest feels the deities' essences but it does not mean the deities' spirits enter the priest's mortal body. As a religious leader authorized to perform the sacred rituals of a religion, especially as a mediatory agent between humans and one or more deities, the "thanh đồng" in Đạo Mẫu is more of the equivalent of a priest rather than a medium or a shaman.

Overview

Lên đồng is commonly associated with the religion of the "Mother Goddess".
The date of lên đồng rituals are typically planned to coincide with a festival, anniversary, or the inauguration of a Mother house, although rituals may also be performed at more informal occasions. Rituals are generally held in temples, pagodas or similarly sacred locations. Votive offerings—which may range from flowers, cakes and sweets to alcohol, cigarettes and jewelry—and, on certain occasions, even Coca-Cola cans—must be purchased. Mediums generally also purchase a number of different costumes to be worn during the ritual. Before the main ritual takes place, mediums undergo several days of purifying rituals, involving abstention from sexual intercourse and eating meat.

The main ritual, which may last from two to seven hours, begins with petitions to Buddha and to the deities for permission to carry out the ritual, after which the medium seats him or herself (both men and women may act as mediums) in the middle of four assistants, whose job it is to facilitate the medium's incarnation of different deities and spirits. Specially trained musicians and singers will perform invocation songs to induce a trance in the medium, at which point he or she will be ready to incarnate different spirits.

Assistants will help the medium don different costumes to match the particular gods they are incarnating; for example, if a practitioner is acting as a medium for a god who takes the form of a general, he or she may wear a general's robes, and perform a dance incorporating swords or other weapons. A medium may incarnate several gods during one session, changing his or her costume and adapting his or her movements to each. Musicians—singers and instrumentalists—accompany the practitioner, and shift from one musical style to the next depending on which god is being incarnated. When the dance is finished, the audience is allowed to approach the still-possessed medium to make offerings, petition the deity being incarnated in exchange for favours, or to have their fortune told. The medium offers sacred gifts in return, often in the form of joss sticks.

History

Early development and practice

Contemporary practice
During early Communist rule, the practice of lên đồng (and Đạo Mẫu in general) were seen as forms of superstition and proscribed, although practitioners continued to perform rituals in secret. In 1987, after a period of prohibition, the Vietnamese government relaxed restrictions on the practice of lên đồng, and it gradually saw a recurrence in popularity; in 2001, it was the subject of an international conference, and a foreign delegation was allowed to attend a festival at Phủ Giày in Nam Định Province. While practitioners are generally allowed to practice in private, government opposition to the practice still exists; in 2010, for instance, a government circular was enacted to curb certain forms of lên đồng practice, specifically formal lên đồng festivals.

Lên đồng is performed throughout Vietnam, and also in places with significant populations of Overseas Vietnamese, such as the United States (notably in Silicon Valley, south of San Francisco, California), Italy, France and Australia. Lên đồng can also be seen as the Vietnamese version of East Asian spirit mediumship practiced in places such as Taiwan, Singapore and Hong Kong.

Etymology
The word 'đồng' or 'toŋ' is believed to be an Austroasiatic lexicon. It means shaman in Mon. In the Munda languages, it means 'to dance' in Sora and 'a kind of dance, drumming and singing connected with wedding ceremony' in Santali.

See also
Chầu văn — the form of music used in lên đồng rituals
Đạo Mẫu
Hijra (South Asia)
Kathoey, a distinct transgender group in Thailand.
Mediumship
Vietnamese folk religion
Religion in Vietnam

Notes and references
Notes

References

External links
"Lên đồng" (English)

Vietnamese folk religion